Karksi Parish was a rural municipality of Estonia, in Viljandi County. In 2009, it has a population of 4,041 (as of 1 January 2009) and an area of 321.45 km².

After the municipal elections held on 15 October 2017, Karksi Parish was merged with Abja and Halliste parishes and the town of Mõisaküla to form a new Mulgi Parish.

Settlements
Town
Karksi-Nuia
Villages
Ainja - Allaste - Äriküla - Hirmuküla - Karksi - Kõvaküla - Leeli - Lilli - Mäeküla - Metsaküla - Morna - Muri - Oti - Pärsi - Polli - Pöögle - Sudiste - Suuga - Tuhalaane - Univere

History 
Karksi was first mentioned in documents in 1241. In the 13th century the parish and the castle emerged. The St. Peter's Church of Karksi with its striking tower was built on a side wall of the castle of the Teutonic Order destroyed in 1708. Today's Karksi mansion was built in the 18th century in the Early Classicist style.

Ordensburg Karkus 

The Ordensburg Karkus was built in the 13th century and destroyed in 1708. The castle is now a ruin.

See also
Battle of Karksi (1600)

References

External links